Arron Jones (born 27 December 1987), best known by his nickname of "Prince Arron", is a British former professional boxer who competed from 2006 to 2013. He is a former British Masters champion. He held the British Light middleweight title in 2011 by stopping Sam Webb to claim the belt and challenged once for the EBU European middleweight title in 2013.

Early professional career
Arron's professional debut came on 28 April 2006 with a victory over Tommy Jones at the Midland Hotel in Manchester. He fought 
and won four more times that year before meeting undefeated fellow prospect Anthony Small at the Elephant and Castle in Southwark on 21 October 2006.  The fight, Arron's fifth, resulted in a second round stoppage defeat against Small who would go on to become the British and Commonwealth champion in later fights.  Arron got back to winning ways in his next fight against journeyman Rocky muscas but suffered defeat once more in his seventh professional contest against undefeated Leeds fighter Danny Reynolds. The fight on 3 December 2006, Droylsden, resulted in a points loss for Prince Arron over six rounds meaning that Arron in his debut year as a professional finished with a record of 7–0.

British Masters Title and fight with Duddy
In 2007 Arron kept up his busy schedule and begun the year well, when on 18 February 2007, he defeated George Hillyard at the York hall. One victory followed against Sherman Alleyne before meeting Cello Renda at the Midland Hotel for the British Masters Middleweight title. The fight against Renda was the Droylsden man's first 10 rounder and resulted in a distance win and a first career title for the Princess. Further wins followed in 2007 against Olufemi Moses and Martin Marshall Mathers before travelling to Dublin for a high-profile clash with Irish fighter John Duddy. The fight with Duddy on 20 October 2007 resulted in a third career defeat for Arron as the unbeaten and more experienced Duddy stopped him in the second round.

Prizefighter win
Arron fought just once in 2008 defeating Tony Randell before returning in 2009 and scoring wins over the likes of Dee Mitchell, Danny Gwilym and Taz Jones.  On 18 December 2009 however Arron's hopes of completing a series of wins in the year were dashed with his first career draw against Max Maxwell over six rounds at the York Hall. In 2010 Arron was chosen as a participant in the tenth installment of the Prizefighter series which this time featured light middleweights. The tournament on 26 February 2010 pitched Arron in the quarter finals against George Hillyard with the Prince winning on points.  The semi-finals resulted in a career best win for Arron with a win over the tournament favourite and former Commonwealth champion Bradley Pryce.In the final Arron faced former amateur champion Brett Flournoy who had fought his way to the final with wins over the undefeated Steve O'Meara and former British title challenger Danny Butler. A close final turned the way of Arron, when in the third and final round, the tournaments only knockdown resulted in all three judges scoring unanimous decisions.

Arron returned to the ring following the Prizefighter success on 7 May 2010 for a re-match with Max Maxwell, the man with whom he had drawn against the previous year.  The fight in Widnes resulted in a much clearer result this time with Arron handed a points win over 8 rounds. In his next fight on 9 July 2010 he had a victory over former victim Tony Randell, stopping him in the sixth round. On 25 September 2010 Arron recorded his third consecutive win following his Prizefighter victory beating Hungarian Mihaly Kotai with sixth round stoppage.

British Light Middleweight Title
Arron challenged for the British light middleweight title against reigning champion Sam Webb on 13 May 2011.  Webb, who had won the title against Anthony Small and made one defence against Martin Concepcion got the better of the early exchanges before a right hook sent the champion to the canvas in the 5th round.  Webb managed to hold out despite an onslaught of punches to the end of the round and was eventually stopped in the 12th. Of the first knockdown Arron questioned the decision not to halt the fight in the 5th saying: "He didn't throw a shot for about two minutes after he went down" and adding: "I was hitting him with big shots and he was just fighting on instinct". Speaking of his achievement, Arron's trainer Bob Shannon said: "He's going to be a force to be reckoned with...he's got so much potential, he could go all the way".

He later won the British title from Sam Webb in London in 2011. Arron has since lost the British title to Blackpool-based fighter Brian Rose, after a split decision at Wigan's Robin Park Arena.

Professional boxing record

References

English male boxers
Light-middleweight boxers
1987 births
Living people
Prizefighter contestants